The fastest production motorcycle for a given year is the unmodified motorcycle with the highest tested top speed that was manufactured in series and available for purchase by the general public. Modified or specially produced motorcycles are a different class, motorcycle land-speed record. Unlike those records, which are officially sanctioned by the Fédération Internationale de Motocyclisme (FIM), production model tests were conducted under a variety of unequal or undefined conditions, and tested by numerous different sources, mainly motorcycling magazines. This has led to inconsistent and sometimes contradictory speed statistics from various sources.

Fastest production motorcycles

Several models went out of production before being surpassed by a contemporary with a higher top speed. Until a model was introduced that was faster than any previous motorcycle, the fastest bike on the market for a given year was actually slower than an earlier, out of production bike. Models which are actual top speed record holders have their make, model, and speed in bold font, while slower models which were only the fastest in their own time are in italic. For example, in 1956, the Vincent Black Shadow remained the fastest motorcycle to date, with a  top speed, but it was no longer in production.

†Rear wheel horsepower. See Motorcycle testing and measurement.

Motorcycles not meeting all criteria 
These motorcycles are mentioned here because they meet some of this list's criteria, and are often discussed in media in the same context as production, street-legal motorcycles, but they do not strictly meet all of the criteria, being limited production or made to order, or not generally available for immediate sale to the public, or are track-only and not generally street legal in Europe, Asia, and North America.

Gentlemen's agreement to end competition

After just over a century of one-upmanship by motorcycle manufacturers, beginning with the 1894–1897 Hildebrand & Wolfmüller, the competition to create the fastest production motorcycle reached a truce, with the arrival of the 1999 Suzuki Hayabusa, that lasted about 8 years. A gentlemen's agreement was made among the major motorcycle manufacturers to limit the speed of their machines to 300 km/h (186 mph), starting with 2000 models.

After the 1999 Hayabusa sent shockwaves by exceeding the Honda CBR1100XX's record by more than 10 mph (16 km/h), and rumors and leaks from Kawasaki hinted that their upcoming 2000 Ninja ZX-12R would pass the 200 mph (322 km/h) milestone, some regulators and politicians in Europe called for an import ban against high speed motorcycles. There were fears that there would be "an outbreak of illegal racing as riders try to break the 200 mph barrier". To preempt regulation and avoid negative publicity, the manufacturers voluntarily ended the race to ever higher speeds.

Sources vary as to whether this unofficial agreement is precise or only approximate, and whether it is defined as 300 km/h or as 186 mph, though the European and Japanese manufacturers normally use metric units. While Honda did announce that its motorcycles would not go faster than 300 km/h, Suzuki and Kawasaki would not speak on record about this issue. The agreement between them and the other brands has never been officially acknowledged by the manufacturers, though media sources report it via unnamed informants, and by testing the top speed of motorcycles known to be capable of exceeding the arbitrary maximum. 
So for 2000 models and later motorcycles, the question of which brand's bike was fastest could only be answered by tampering with the speed limiting system, meaning that it was no longer a contest between stock, production motorcycles, absolving the manufacturer of blame and letting those not quite as fast avoid losing face. But the speed war continued underground, out of the spotlight, with fierce competition among enthusiasts of the "200 mph club", albeit with the slight technical modification necessary to bypass the speed limiter, separating that war from the ostensibly at-peace world of stock motorcycles.

Breakaways from the agreement
Politics be damned: MV is Italian and the Italians have a national imperative to make their bikes as fast as possible," in the opinion of motoring journalist Roland Brown.

Cycle World reported that "the same BMW who instigated the 'agreement' in the first place" had broken it with the  BMW S1000RR, whose top speed was reported in July, 2010.

The 2013 Ducati 1199 Panigale R was delivered with an electronic speedometer that blanked when the motorcycle exceeded 186 mph (300 km/h), leading commentators to question if Ducati was signaling their withdrawal from the gentlemen's agreement.

See also
 Motorcycle testing and measurement
 Motorcycle land-speed record
 List of fastest production motorcycles by acceleration

Notes

Fastest Production
Fastest Production Motorcycles